Carpathonesticus ljovuschkini  is a species of araneomorph spider of the family Nesticidae. It occurs in the Russian Caucasus. No male specimens have yet been described.

Description
The prosoma is 1.63 mm long and 1.45 mm wide in the described female.

Original publication

References 

Nesticidae
Spiders described in 1965
Spiders of Russia